Frøya Fotballklubb is a Norwegian association football club from Frøya, Sør-Trøndelag.

The club was founded on 5 November 1990 as a cooperation team between the multi-sports clubs Frøya IL, Nabeita IL, and Sistranda IL.

The men's football team currently plays in the Fourth Division, the fourth tier of Norwegian football. It has had stints in the 3. divisjon from 1999 to 2000 and 2010 to 2012.

References

External links
 

Football clubs in Norway
Association football clubs established in 1990
Sport in Trøndelag
1990 establishments in Norway